Pierre Luquet (born 19 December 1975 in Bagnères-de-Bigorre) is a French slalom canoeist who competed at the international level from 1992 to 2009 exclusively in the C2 class together with his twin brother Christophe.

He won four medals at the ICF Canoe Slalom World Championships with a gold (C2 team: 2002) and three silvers (C2: 2002, 2007, C2 team: 2007). He also won a silver and a bronze in the C2 team event at the European Championships.

World Cup individual podiums

References

French male canoeists
Living people
1975 births
Medalists at the ICF Canoe Slalom World Championships